Hair Trigger Stuff is a 1920 American short silent Western film directed by B. Reeves Eason and starring Hoot Gibson.

Cast
 Hoot Gibson 
 Mildred Moore
 George Field
 Beatrice Dominguez
 Tote Du Crow
 Charles Newton
 Andrew Waldron

See also
 Hoot Gibson filmography

External links
 

1920 films
1920 Western (genre) films
1920 short films
American silent short films
American black-and-white films
Films directed by B. Reeves Eason
Silent American Western (genre) films
1920s American films